The "National Development Party" (NDP) is a moderate political party in The Bahamas, currently without political representation.

Party formation
The National Development Party (NDP) originated following a series of meetings between Mr. B. J. Moss and Dr. Andre’ Rollins in September 2008. Both men were motivated to form a new political party due to a belief that there existed no clear vision or plan for the development of the Bahamas being articulated by either of the established political parties. 

Their view was that many of the problems besetting the nation and its impending growth, was clearly due to the emphasis on partisan politics, rather than nation building. Subsequently, the very precepts of the National Development Party, centers around nation building, which is the philosophical underpinning of this new political organization. This inspired the naming of the party the National Development Party.

Application for party’s registration was officially done in October 2008. One of the primary philosophical beliefs was that the party needed to focus on the philosophy and not the cult of personality, and on political ideology instead of political idolatry. Hence, the decision was made to form an executive steering committee that would be responsible for the formative development of the party from its embryonic stages to a viable political organization. 

Open house meetings commenced in early 2009, the party’s steering committee was established shortly thereafter. The party then elected Dr. Andre Rollins to be the chairperson in October 2009. In August 2010, the party elected Mr. Renward Wells as chairperson of the executive steering committee. Mr. Wells would lead the executive steering committee until November 2010 when the National Development Party had its first National Convention. Mr. Renward Wells went on to be the party's first leader, winning at the polls; Mr. Lindon Nairn became the party's first Deputy Leader.

2010 Elizabeth By-Election
On January 13, 2010, The NDP announced its intention to run in the Elizabeth By-Election, which was forced due to the resignation of former Elizabeth Member of Parliament Malcom Adderly. In the press-release, the former chairman of the NDP Dr. Andre Rollins stated that the NDP would become the first party in the history of Bahamian politics to hold a constituency candidate primary and debate to select its Elizabeth candidate. This Primary and debate took place at the Joe Farrington Road Auditorium on Wednesday, January 27, 2010, and Dr. Rollins was voted to be the NDP's By-Election representative. On voting day, February 16, 2010, Rollins was determined to have received a total of 72 votes.

External links
Official site

Political parties established in 2008
Political parties in the Bahamas